Houbricka is a genus of sea snails, marine gastropod mollusks in the family Pyramidellidae, the pyrams and their allies.

Species
Species within the genus Houbricka include:
 Houbricka incisa (Bush, 1899)

References

External links
 To ITIS
 To World Register of Marine Species

Pyramidellidae
Monotypic gastropod genera